Looking for Mr. Goodbar may refer to:

 Looking for Mr. Goodbar (novel), a 1975 novel by Judith Rossner
 Looking for Mr. Goodbar (film), a 1977 film adaptation, starring Diane Keaton